The Winged Horse, also known by its reissue title of The Wing Horse, is a theatrical short cartoon by Walter Lantz Productions, featuring Oswald the Lucky Rabbit. It is the 59th Oswald short produced by Lantz's studio, and the 112th to feature the character.

Plot
Oswald is riding on an elephant, exploring a city in the Middle East. Joining him is a female cat dancing inside a booth which is also on the elephant. Suddenly, the Kitty's booth snags onto a hook of an overhead bar. In no time, a saluki, who wears a turban and rides a camel, comes by and takes her. But because Oswald isn't too far away, the rabbit hears her distress call, and reverses direction. Not wanting Oswald to intervene, the saluki also charges forth.

When Oswald's elephant and the saluki's camel collide head on, the riders are thrown off and are unconscious for a few moments. While the elephant and the camel fight over the crash, the saluki recovers quickly, picks up the kitty, finds a flying carpet, and takes off. Oswald momentarily awakes, but it was already too late. A chance for the rabbit to get back his partner is found when he spots a stallion with wings inside a shop. Although the horse is very frail at first, Oswald is able to get the stallion into shape on time before finally flying.

Up in the skies, the saluki is still on the carpet with the kitty. Surprisingly, Oswald and the stallion catch up from behind. The saluki then conjures a rifle, and manages to fire a few shots. When the kitty intervenes several times, the saluki, who is no longer interested in her, kicks the bruin off the carpet. Oswald and the stallion dive to catch her in mid-air. The saluki resumes firing the rifle until a shot is landed. Despite going down after being struck, the stallion is able to get back as the horse bites on and tears the carpet apart. All four of them start to plunge.

Back on the ground, Oswald's elephant and the saluki's camel are still pummeling each other over the collision incident. Just then, Oswald, the kitty, the saluki, and the horse drop on them. When the dust clears, Oswald and the teddy bear are both in one piece. But the saluki, stallion, elephant, and camel somehow fuse bodies. The rabbit and the bruin then continue the exploration, riding on their new conjoined creatures.

References

External links
 The Winged Horse at the Big Cartoon Database
 

1932 films
1932 animated films
1930s American animated films
1930s animated short films
American black-and-white films
Films directed by Walter Lantz
Films set in the Middle East
Oswald the Lucky Rabbit cartoons
Universal Pictures animated short films
Walter Lantz Productions shorts
Animated films about bears
Animated films about dogs
Animated films about horses
Winged horses
Animated films without speech